Home Farm is an historic farmhouse in Old Dalby, Leicestershire, England. It was built in 1635 and is a Grade II listed building. Dating to the Georgian period, it was substantially enlarged in 1835, when it became home farm to the nearby Old Hall.

The building stands directly opposite the church of St John the Baptist, a Grade II* listed building.

References

External links
Home Farm – Google Street View, March 2010

1635 establishments in England
Houses completed in 1635
Grade II listed buildings in Leicestershire
Houses in Leicestershire
Farmhouses in England